Kelvin Harmon (born December 15, 1997) is a Liberian gridiron football wide receiver who is a free agent. Born in Monrovia, he came to the United States at the age of four. Harmon played college football at NC State and was drafted by the Washington Redskins in the sixth round of the 2019 NFL Draft.

Early years
Harmon was born in Monrovia, the capital of Liberia, on December 15, 1997, and moved to Palmyra, New Jersey in the United States when he was four. There, he attended Palmyra High School and had 165 receptions for 2,764 yards and 36 touchdowns. A 4-star recruit, he originally committed to South Carolina to play college football, but decommited and attended NC State instead, over offers from Indiana, Miami, North Carolina, Rutgers, and West Virginia, among others.

College career
As a freshman at NC State in 2016, Harmon had 27 receptions for 462 yards and five touchdowns. As a sophomore in 2017, he had 69 receptions for 1,017 yards and four touchdowns. He was the first NC State receiver to have 1,000 yards since 2003. As a junior in 2018, he had 81 receptions for 1,186 receiving yards and seven receiving touchdowns.

Professional career

In December 2018, Harmon announced that he would forgo his final year of eligibility and declared for the 2019 NFL Draft, where he was drafted by the Washington Redskins in the sixth round with the 206th overall pick. In the Redskins' 2019 season opener against the Philadelphia Eagles, he had two receptions for 31 yards in his NFL debut. Overall, he appeared in all 16 games as a rookie and totaled 30 receptions for 365 yards.

In June 2020, Harmon suffered an ACL tear injury while training and was placed on the team's non-football injury list at the start of training camp the following month. He was moved to the reserve/non-football injury list on September 5, 2020. He was released on August 15, 2021, but re-signed to their practice squad on September 29, 2021. Harmon signed a reserve/futures contract with the team on January 10, 2022, but was waived on August 23, 2022.

References

External links

NC State Wolpack bio

Living people
People from Palmyra, New Jersey
Players of American football from New Jersey
Sportspeople from Burlington County, New Jersey
Liberian emigrants to the United States
American football wide receivers
NC State Wolfpack football players
1997 births
Washington Redskins players
Sportspeople from Monrovia
Washington Football Team players